Larapan Island is a Malaysian island located in the Celebes Sea on the state of Sabah. The island is one of the many islands in Malaysia and has been under Sabah Provincial management of Malaysia. The islands are managed under the Rule and governance of the Malaysian govt.

Population 
A few hundred people of Local Families live on the Island so far in 2023.

Weather 
29 °C, Wind NE at 14 km/h, 74% Humidity

Above the Sea level 
The estimate terrain elevation above sea level is 12 meters.

See also
 List of islands of Malaysia

References

Islands of Sabah